, is a Japanese mathematician working in systems theory, control theory, and signal processing.

References
YYfest 2010 Symposium on Systems, Control, and Signal Processing In honor of Yutaka Yamamoto on the occasion of his 60th birthday Kyoto University. 29–31 March 2010

External links
Personal website at Kyoto University

20th-century Japanese mathematicians
21st-century Japanese mathematicians
Fellow Members of the IEEE
Academic staff of Kyoto University
Year of birth missing (living people)
Living people